The Ultimate Rush is a 1998 novel by author Joe Quirk about a roller-blading messenger in San Francisco named Chet Griffin who spends his nights hacking for fun. One of his messenger deliveries gets him mixed up in an illegal investment scheme. He discovers the illegal activities and is framed for murder by a corrupt police officer. He is chased through the streets by the police, the Italian and Chinese mafias, and the Federal Computer Investigations Committee. He uses his skills as a hacker to expose the corruption and save his girlfriend.

Legal issues 
In 2011, a lawsuit was filed against Sony Pictures by author Joe Quirk, asserting that the 2012 feature film Premium Rush was in fact based on Quirk's screenplay from his 1998 novel The Ultimate Rush. The suit laid out many plot, character name, and scene similarities to Quirk's original screenplay. On April 2, 2013, U.S. District Judge Richard Seeborg dismissed this case, finding that the two works were not substantially similar.

References

External links
The Ultimate Rush excerpt at the Joe Quirk official website

1998 American novels